The Myanmar Baptist Convention is a Baptist Christian denomination in Myanmar. It is affiliated with the Baptist World Alliance and the World Council of Churches. The headquarters is in Yangon.

History
The Convention has its origins in an American mission of the American Baptist Mission (American Baptist Churches USA) in 1813 from Adoniram Judson and Ann Judson to Yangon.  It was officially founded in 1865 as the Burma Baptist Missionary Convention. In 2006, it had 4,522 churches and 1,142,655 members. According to a denomination census released in 2020, it claimed 5,319 churches and 1,710,441 members.

Member Associations
Myanmar Baptist Churches Union
Karen Baptist Convention
Kachin Baptist Convention
Lisu Baptist Convention
Chin Baptist Convention
Southern Shan State Baptist Home Mission Society
Shweli Shan Baptist Convention
Northern Shan State Baptist Convention
Eastern Shan State Baptist Convention
Akhar Baptist Convention
Naga Baptist Convention
Tedim Baptist Convention
Asho Chin Baptist Convention
Wa Baptist Convention
Po Kayin Baptist Convention
Rakhine Baptist Convention
Mon Baptist Convention
Lahu Baptist Convention
Judson Baptist Chutch
Immenual Baptist Churches

Departments of Myanmar Baptist Convention
Finance & Property
Evangelism & Mission
Christian Education
Christian Communication
Theological Education
Christian Social and Service & Development
Literature & Publication
Leadership Development
Ministers
Men
Women
Youth

Education
The Convention operates the Myanmar Institute of Theology, the leading Christian seminary in Myanmar, founded in 1927 and located in Insein. The Convention is also planning to operate a Christian University in the near future.

See also
Myanmar Institute of Theology
Protestants in Burma
 Bible
 Born again
 Baptist beliefs
 Worship service (evangelicalism)
 Jesus Christ
 Believers' Church

References

External links
 Official Website

Baptist denominations in Asia
Baptist Christianity in Myanmar
1865 establishments in Burma